Mariah Waterfall O'Brien (born June 25, 1971) is an American interior designer and former actress and model. She made her film debut in the drama Gas, Food, Lodging (1992) and later appeared in the horror film Halloween: The Curse of Michael Myers (1995). O'Brien also appeared on the cover of Alice in Chains' 1992 album Dirt.

Early life
O'Brien was born on June 25, 1971, and raised in the small town of Dellroy, Ohio. Her parents were hippie musicians, and her middle name Waterfall was based on the Jimi Hendrix song. The family later moved to Los Angeles, where O'Brien appeared in local theaters. Her mother is actress Jackie O'Brien, with whom she appeared in the film Together & Alone.

Career

Acting
O'Brien has appeared in films such as Gas, Food Lodging, Halloween: The Curse of Michael Myers, Being John Malkovich, Diamonds, Ticker, The Mod Squad, and Some Girl. Her television credits include Buffy the Vampire Slayer, Charmed, The Nanny, Once and Again and Courting Alex.

Modelling
O'Brien appeared on the cover of Spinal Tap's 1992 single "Bitch School".

She is also featured on the cover of Alice in Chains' 1992 album Dirt.

Personal life
O'Brien was married to actor Giovanni Ribisi from 1997 to 2001; they have a daughter born in 1997.

Since 2005, O'Brien works as an interior designer in Los Angeles and is the owner of Mariah O'Brien Interiors.

Filmography

Film

Television

References

External links
 Official website
 
 

1971 births
Living people
People from Carroll County, Ohio
American film actresses
American television actresses
20th-century American actresses
Actresses from Ohio
American interior designers
American women interior designers
21st-century American women